The Office Wife is a 1930 American pre-Code romantic drama film directed by Lloyd Bacon, released by Warner Bros., and based on the novel of the same name by Faith Baldwin. It was the talkie debut for Joan Blondell who would become one of the major Warner Bros. stars for the following nine years.

Plot
Publisher Larry Fellowes (Lewis Stone) believes that Andrews, his stenographer/secretary (played by Dale Fuller), spends more time with him and makes more decisions than a wife would for her husband. He persuades author Kate Halsey (Blanche Friderici) to write a novel based on this premise.

When Andrews learns of Larry's plans to marry Linda (Natalie Moorhead), the secretary has a nervous breakdown because she is in love with him herself. A new attractive, intelligent and efficient secretary, Anne Murdock (Dorothy Mackaill), is hired while Larry is on his honeymoon. Larry, a workaholic, begins to neglect his wife working with his secretary, and they both fall in love. Meanwhile, his wife is seeing another man (played by Brooks Benedict), with whom she falls in love.

Eventually, Larry kisses Anne while they are working together at his apartment, while Linda makes love with her young gigolo, who gives her the key to his apartment and says goodnight. Linda returns to her husband (after giving them enough time to compose themselves) and tells Larry that they should go to bed as it is very late. Anne watches as Larry goes to the bedroom with his wife and closes the door behind him. She is heartbroken and decides she will give him her resignation in the morning.

Linda decides to divorce Larry. Anne agrees to marry her long-time admirer Ted O'Hara after giving her resignation. On the final day of work, Anne's sister Katherine Murdock (Joan Blondell) phones the confused Larry and explains everything, bringing about a happy ending.

Cast
Dorothy Mackaill as Anne Murdock
Lewis Stone as Larry Fellowes
Natalie Moorhead as Linda Fellowes
Hobart Bosworth as J.P. McGowan
Joan Blondell as Katherine Murdock
Blanche Friderici as Kate Halsey
Brooks Benedict as Jameson
Dale Fuller as Secretary Andrews
Walter Merrill as Ted O'Hara

Cast notes:
 Dickie Moore makes a cameo appearance in the scene by the pool.

Preservation status
The film survives intact, preserved by the Library of Congress.

Home media
The film was released on DVD from Warner Archive made-on-demand as a double bill with Dorothy Mackaill's Party Husband.

References

External links 
 
 
 

1930 films
Warner Bros. films
Films based on American novels
1930s English-language films
Films directed by Lloyd Bacon
American romantic drama films
1930 romantic drama films
American black-and-white films
Films based on works by Faith Baldwin
1930s American films
English-language romantic drama films